Stroești may refer to several places in Romania:

Stroești, a commune in Vâlcea County
 Stroești, a village in Mușătești Commune, Argeș County
 Stroești, a village in Pătârlagele town, Buzău County
 Stroești, a village in Todirești Commune, Iași County
 Stroești, a village in Florești Commune, Mehedinți County

and to:
 Stroești, the Romanian name for Strointsi Commune, Chernivtsi Oblast, Ukraine

See also 
 Stroe (disambiguation)
 Stroiești (disambiguation)